Lanzhou is the capital and largest city of Gansu Province in Northwest China. Located on the banks of the Yellow River, it is a key regional transportation hub, connecting areas further west by rail to the eastern half of the country. Historically, it has been a major link on the Northern Silk Road and it stands to become a major hub on the New Eurasian Land Bridge. The city is also a center for heavy industry and petrochemical industry.

Lanzhou is one of the top 70 major cities in the world by scientific research output as tracked by the Nature Index. The city hosts several research institutions, including, Lanzhou University, Lanzhou University of Technology, Northwest Normal University, Lanzhou Jiaotong University, Gansu University of Chinese Medicine, and Gansu Agricultural University. Notably, Lanzhou University is one of China's prestige universities as a member of the Project 985.

History

Originally in the territory of the ancient Western Qiangs, Lanzhou became part of the territory of the State of Qin in the 6th century BC.

In 81 BC, under the Han dynasty (206 BC–AD 220), it was taken from the Huns' Huandi Chanyu and made the seat of Jincheng commandery (jùn), and later of the Jincheng (Golden City) county (xiàn), later renamed Yunwu. From at least the first millennium BC it was a major link on the ancient Northern Silk Road,  and also an important historic Yellow River crossing site. To protect the city, the Great Wall of China was extended as far as Yumen. Parts of the Great Wall still exist within the built-up area.

After the fall of the Han dynasty, Lanzhou became the capital of a succession of tribal states. In the 4th century it was briefly the capital of the independent state of Liang. The Northern Wei dynasty (386–534) reestablished Jincheng commandery, renaming the county Jincheng (金城 'Gold city'). Mixed with different cultural heritages, the area at present-day Gansu province, from the 5th to the 11th century, became a center for Buddhist study. Under the Sui dynasty (581–618) the city became the seat of Lanzhou prefecture for the first time, retaining this name under the Tang dynasty (618–907). In 763 the area was overrun by the Tibetan Empire and in 843 was conquered by the Tang. Later it fell into the hands of the Western Xia dynasty (which flourished in Qinghai from the 11th to 13th century) and was subsequently absorbed by the Song dynasty (960–1126) in 1081. The name Lanzhou was reestablished, and the county renamed Lanzhuan.

After 1127 it fell into the hands of the Jin dynasty, and after 1235 it came into the possession of the Mongol Empire.

Under the Ming dynasty (1368–1644) the prefecture was demoted to a county and placed under the administration of Lintao superior prefecture, but in 1477 Lanzhou was reestablished as a political unit.

The city acquired its current name in 1656, during the Qing dynasty. When Gansu was made a separate province in 1666, Lanzhou became its capital.

In 1739 the seat of Lintao was transferred to Lanzhou, which was later made a superior prefecture called Lanzhou.

Lanzhou was badly damaged during the Dungan revolt in 1864–1875. In the 1920s and 1930s it became a center of Soviet influence in northwestern China.

Second Sino-Japanese War-World War II
During the Second Sino-Japanese War (1937–1945) Lanzhou, linked with Xi'an by highway in 1935, became the terminus of the  Chinese–Soviet highway, used as a route for Soviet supplies destined for the Xi'an area. This highway remained the primary traffic route of northwestern China until the completion of the railway from Lanzhou to Ürümqi, Xinjiang.

The Battle of Lanzhou
Lanzhou's old Donggang Airport, located near the city centre, was the primary entry point for combat aircraft provided to China under the Sino-Soviet Non-Aggression Pact, and along with other targets around Lanzhou, including civilian centers, were heavily bombed by the Imperial Japanese Army Air Force and Navy Air Force. Many air battles were fought between the Chinese Air Force and the Imperial Japanese air forces over Lanzhou and surrounding regions from 1937 to 1945, particularly from 1938 to 1941 when the influx of Soviet war materials formed the primary support in China's War of Resistance against the Imperial Japanese invasion. Instances of major air-battles include an IJAAF raid consisting of 30 BR.20 and Ki-21 bombers against civilian targets in Lanzhou on 20 February 1939; 17th PS, 5th PG commander Capt. Cen Zeliu and his deputy commander Capt. Ma Guolian (Ma Kwok-Lim), a Canadian-Chinese volunteer for the Chinese Air Force, shot down the first two bombers in the battle, followed by two more downed as Capt. Cen led another attack on the third formation. They would be joined by pilots of the Soviet Volunteer Group led by Nikolay Garilov and the 15th PS led by Li Debiao, who would all shoot down five more of the Japanese bombers; the northern Chinese air-raid early-warning net headquarters in Xi'an observed 21 of the original 30 IJAAF bombers returning from Lanzhou.

As the Imperial Japanese forces were preparing for Operation Z against the United States and other allies in Southeast Asia and the Pacific by mid-1941, the IJANF were busy training new aircrews in live combat action across China for the upcoming war in the Pacific; on 22 May 1941, Lt. Gao Youxin of the 21st PS, 4th PG engaged an IJNAF raid on Lanzhou in an I-16 fighter aircraft, while avoiding confrontation against the Zero fighters, he shot down a Mitsubishi G3M bomber north of Lanzhou. On the ground, the KMT Muslim Generals Ma Hongkui and Ma Bufang protected Lanzhou with their cavalry troops, putting up such resistance that the Japanese never captured Lanzhou.

The city is the seat of a currently vacant Roman Catholic diocese and was previously the center of a vicariate apostolic (Vicariate Apostolic of Northern Kan-Su).

Geography

Area: 
China's northwest geographical center
Zonary basin
Mountains are located on the south and north sides of the city:
Qilian Ranges, Mt. Pingliang and Mt. Kongtong (the most noted in Taoism)
River:
The Yellow River flows through from west to east.

Lanzhou is situated on the upper reaches of the Yellow River where it emerges from the mountains and has been a center since early times, being at the southern end of the route leading via the Hexi Corridor across Central Asia. It commands the approaches to the ancient capital area of Chang'an (modern Xi'an) in Shaanxi province from both the west and the northwest, as well as the area of Qinghai Lake via the upper waters of the Yellow River and its tributaries.

Climate 

Lanzhou is situated in the temperate zone and enjoys a semi-arid climate (Köppen BSk) with hot summers and cold and very dry winters. The winters are so dry that snowfall is sometimes restricted to fall and spring. With monthly percent possible sunshine ranging from 50 percent in December to 59 percent in February, sunshine is generous but not abundant, as the city receives 2,424 hours of bright sunshine annually.

Environmental problems

The city is located in a narrow and curved river valley with surrounding mountains causing it to be hemmed in blocking a free flow of air. According to the National Environmental Analysis released by Tsinghua University and The Asian Development Bank in January 2013, Lanzhou was among the ten most air-polluted cities in the world. Air quality reportedly was so poor that at times one could not see Lanshan, the mountain rising up along the south side of the city. Lanzhou is also the home of many factories, including some involved in petroleum processing, and suffers from large dust storms kicked up from the Gobi Desert, especially in the winter and spring. In 2011, using Chinese statistics, the World Health Organization reported that Lanzhou had the worst air quality among eleven western Chinese cities. Its annual mean PM10 μg/m3 of 150 is 7 times the safe level established by the World Health Organization. It was worse than Beijing with its reading of 121.

Since then, authorities have taken measures to improve air quality, which have largely been successful. "Thirteen polluting enterprises with excessive capacity have been closed, more than 200 highly polluting enterprises were suspended in winter, and 78 industrial enterprises have moved to an industrial park outside the city." In 2015 it was awarded China's climate progress title. As a city once unable to be spotted from satellites, Lanzhou has taken various measures to combat air pollution in recent years, having reduced its Air Pollution Index at the fastest speed across China.  According to the 2018 WHO database, of 2700 towns listed, Lanzhou has the 158th highest level of PM 2.5 pollution, with an average of 54 micrograms per cubic meter (twice that of Milan).  The large particle PM10 remains high, at 132 micrograms per cubic meter, in part as a result of sand storms.

The reach of the Yellow River at Lanzhou carries a high load of silt, giving the river its characteristic muddy appearance; however water quality in this reach is better than the "fetid outflow that barely passes for water two hours downstream" (2008). In recent years, several specimens of the endangered Chinese giant salamander have been found in and near the Yellow River in Lanzhou.

On April 11, 2014, Lanzhou officials advised residents not to drink tap water, because benzene levels were 20 times the national limit of 10 micrograms per liter. The city water supply suspected industrial chemical production to be the culprit, similar to what happened in the 2005 Jilin chemical plant explosions.

A brucellosis outbreak infecting humans took place in Lanzhou in 2020 after the Lanzhou Biopharmaceutical Plant involved in vaccine production accidentally pumped out the bacteria into the atmosphere in exhaust air, due to use of expired desinfectant, and affecting over 3,000 people.

Earthquakes
Lanzhou experiences earthquakes regularly, although usually at low intensities.  In 1920 a large earthquake was experienced killing more than 100,000 people in Ningxia and Eastern Gansu province, although only 42 were killed in Lanzhou itself, the low number being attributed to the strong yet flexible nature of the wooden buildings in the city. Lanzhou was also affected by 2008 Sichuan earthquake in 2008.

Demographics 
As of the 2020 Chinese census, Lanzhou surpassed 4 million population for the first time, with a total population of 4,359,446 inhabitants and 3,042,863 in the built-up (or metro) area of 1,112.9 square kilometres (429.7 sq mi) made of the 4 central urban districts, Lanzhou Xin, near the airport, growing very quickly and Honnggu Districts not yet conurbated. This marked a significant growth after a period of slower growth. The strong growth has been attributed to parents seeking better education opportunities for their children, retired migrant workers returning to Gansu, improved services in the city and government policies.

Sport
The 14,000-capacity Northwest Minzu University Stadium is one of the main sports venues in the city. It is mostly used for football games. A new sports center complex, including a stadium with a capacity of 60,000 spectators and a swimming hall, is under development.

Lanzhou previously had a professional soccer team named Gansu Tianma from 1999 to 2003.The team played in Chinese Football Association Yi League from 1999 to 2001 and bought a position in the Jia League from Tianjin Lifei. The team relocated to Ningbo, Zhejiang and changed their name to Ningbo Yaoma in 2003. The team later relegated to China League Two in 2004 and became Dongguan Dongcheng after moving to Dongguan, Guangdong.

Former England international Paul Gascoigne played four games in both a playing and coaching role for Gansu in 2003, scoring two goals, before returning to England after falling out with the club, as his mental state meant that he had to return to America for treatment against drink and depression.

Administrative divisions

On August 20, 2012, Lanzhou New Area was approved by the State Council of China's Central Government. In 2019, Lanzhou New Area was formally established as a county-level division of Lanzhou, its area being split off from Yongdeng and Gaolan. The updated area and population of Yongdeng and Gaolan are not yet reflected in the table.

Tourism

The Five Spring Mountain Park was built at the northern side of Gaolan Mountain, is famous for its five springs and several Buddhist temples.
The Zhongshan Bridge was the first permanent bridge over the Yellow River.
The Lanzhou Botanical Garden, located in the Anning District, has a large variety of trees, flowers and other plants.
Xiguan Mosque, is one of the larger mosques in China.
On Wuquan Mountain, many ancient architectural sites are located.
Xinglong Mountain, is covered with thick pine forests and scattered with colorful temples.
Lutusi ancient government, a large complex of ancient governmental buildings.

Museums

Gansu Provincial Museum, displays archaeological and fossil finds from Gansu and exhibitions on Gansu's history.
Lanzhou Museum, is an important cultural unit on the Silk Road. As of October 2017, the collection contains more than 13,000 pieces of collections, including pottery, porcelain, bronze, calligraphy, coins, jade, stoneware, etc. There are 52 national first-class cultural relics, 78 national second-level cultural relics and 682 national third-level cultural relics.
Gansu Art Museum, Providing a broad display and external communication platform for artists.
Lanzhou City Planning Exhibition Hall, showing the profound Yellow River culture of Lanzhou and integrating indoor exhibition, architectural concept and urban characteristics.
Lanzhou Painted Pottery Museum, The total number of collections is 250, including 50 precious cultural relics,  it displays the painted pottery civilization represented by the cultural pottery of Majiayao.
Gansu Science and Technology Museum sound, light, electricity and other high-tech means will be fully adopted, and the way of teaching and learning will enable visitors to embrace modern science in a pleasant atmosphere.

Economy

Since 1949 Lanzhou has been transformed from the capital of a poverty-stricken province into the center of a major industrial area. It was one of the first cities in China to industrialize, as a focus of the First and Second Five-Year Plans.

The GDP per capita of Lanzhou was 25,566 (RMB) (US$3,681) in 2008, ranking it at number 134 among 659 Chinese cities. In 2015, the GDP per capita had grown to 57,191 RMB (US$9182.28) and the city ranked at place 100 for total GDP of Chinese cities.

Institutions
The International Solar Energy Center (UNIDO-ISEC) is located in Lanzhou's Chengguan district.

Natural resources
Minerals: coal, gold, silver, zinc, nickel, manganese, clay, and dolomite
Hydropower

There is a thermal generating plant supplied with coal from fields in Qinghai. In addition, there is a hydroelectric station at Zhulama Gorge in Gansu, and a large multipurpose dam has been built in the Liujia Gorge on the Yellow River above Lanzhou.

Industry
Main industries include textile mills, rubber processing and fertilizer plants, an oil refinery, petrochemicals, machinery, and metallurgical industry.

Gansu has one of the largest oil refineries in the country and Lanzhou itself is the center of the province's petrochemical industry. The refinery is linked to the fields at Yumen by pipeline. It also manufactures equipment for the oil industry.

Lanzhou has a large textile industry, particularly noted for the production of woolen and leather goods. In addition, Lanzhou produces locomotives and rolling stock for the northwestern railways, as well as machine tools and mining equipment. Aluminum products, industrial chemicals, and fertilizers are produced on a large scale, and there is a large rubber industry. Copper is mined in nearby Gaolan.

Lanzhou has been one of the centers of China's national nuclear power industry since the 1960s.

Agriculture
Lanzhou is the collecting center and market for agricultural produce and livestock from a wide area.

Spring wheat, vegetables, beans, oil-boiling, melon, peaches, and tobacco
Roses and lilies

Transportation

Airport

It opened for public service in 1970.

The airport offers direct connections to over 70 international and domestic destinations.

Railway

Subway

Lanzhou was the second city in northwest China to announce the construction of a subway line, in August 2012. The urban railway network, Lanzhou Metro, is planned to consist of six subway lines running . The first line, which is completely underground, opened in June 2019. Lanzhou's second subway line is under construction.

Regional
Lanzhou Railway Station is a major railway hub of western China. Every day over 100 passenger trains originate or pass via this station. It is a vital focal point connecting the western provinces with the east. Lanzhou Railway Station is located on Huochezhan Dong Lu, in Chengguan district. Lanzhou West Railway Station is the city's second major railway station, offering connection to high-speed rail services.

Lanzhou Railway Station has the following railway connections:
Longhai Railway to the east (Xi'an, Zhengzhou, Lianyungang), with connection to the main railway of eastern China supporting direct trains to Beijing, Shanghai, etc. Finished in 1953, it was the first railway to reach Lanzhou.
Lanxin Railway to the west and northwest (with direct trains to western Gansu and Ürümqi, and further connections to other points in Xinjiang and to Kazakhstan)
 Lanqing Railway to the west and southwest, with direct service to Xining and Lhasa
Chongqing–Lanzhou railway to southeast, with direct service to Chongqing and Guangyuan
 A line to the north and northeast, with direct service to Yinchuan and Baotou
 Lanzhou–Zhongchuan Airport Intercity Railway between Lanzhou Railway Station and Lanzhou Zhongchuan International Airport.
 Lanhe Railway (under construction) to Linxia and Hezuo.

High speed rail
New high-speed passenger-only railways are completed both toward the east (the Xuzhou–Lanzhou high-speed railway) and the west (the Lanzhou–Xinjiang high-speed railway). These services only stop at Lanzhou West Railway Station. The Yinchuan–Lanzhou high-speed railway and Chengdu–Lanzhou high-speed railway are under construction.

Freight rail
Lanzhou forms an important link in one of the routes of the Eurasian Land Bridge and also provides rail access to Qinghai, Xinjiang and Tibet further to the west. A large rail freight terminal has recently been constructed to accommodate increasing volumes of rail freight and Lanzhou is home to China's fourth largest marshalling yard.

Regular freight services connect Lanzhou to destinations including Chongqing, Hamburg, Almaty and Kathmandu.

Road network
In 2016, Lanzhou was ranked 4th of Chinese cities with the worst rush hour traffic jams; however, by 2017, after completion of an urban ring road, it dropped to 33rd place.

Highways
G75 Lanzhou–Haikou Expressway
G30 Lianyungang–Khorgas Expressway
G6 Beijing–Lhasa Expressway
G22 Qingdao–Lanzhou Expressway
G2201 Lanzhou Ring Expressway
China National Highway 212
China National Highway 213
China National Highway 312

Bus services

For long-distance buses, there are three major bus stations in the urban area, West Bus Station in Xiaoxihu neighbourhood, East Bus Station near Lanzhou Station and South Bus Station near G75 Lanzhou–Haikou Expressway terminus. Furthermore, there are a total of 132 local city bus lines. These have their main node station at Xiguan.

Lanzhou has a noted bus rapid transit system which opened in 2013 and won the city an honorable mention at the 2014 Sustainable Transport Awards.

Media
Gansu People's Press, in Lanzhou, publishes Duzhe, the most widely circulated magazine in China.
Lanzhou Radio serves the Lhasa and Lanzhou province regions with news and music.
Gansu Daily, newspaper for Gansu Province, has its editorial offices in Lanzhou.

Culture

The city is the cultural centre of Gansu. It is home to many different ethnic groups and their respective cultures, but the most prominent three groups are the Han, Hui, and Zang.

Chinese opera: Qinqiang Opera
Cuisine: Lanzhou beef lamian noodles, many other types of noodles, the root of the lily, and many different kinds of mutton are important elements of Lanzhou's distinct food culture. Lanzhou Beef noodles are well known throughout China. The city of Lanzhou is home to over 1,000 beef noodle restaurants.
Islam in China: Xiguan Mosque, the mosque was constructed in the Ming dynasty and rebuilt in 1990. The architecture of the mosque predominantly reflects that of Arab architecture.

Colleges and universities

The city is the seat of Lanzhou University, founded in 1909. The National Minorities Institute at Lanzhou and a branch of the Chinese Academy of Sciences are also located in the city. In particular, Northwest Normal University has been the key university at the provincial level, which has prepared over 100,000 teachers in schools across the province Gansu.

List
Note: Institutions without full-time bachelor's degree programs are not listed.

National level

Lanzhou University, founded 1909

Other public institutions
Eastern Gansu University
Gansu Agricultural University, founded 1958 
Gansu University of Chinese Medicine, Formerly known as Gansu College of Traditional Chinese Medicine, it has contributed to Gansu's medical and health undertakings and social development.
College of Politics and Law, Gansu, Based in Gansu, radiating to the northwest, facing the country, actively serving local social development and establishment of the legal system.
Lanzhou University of Arts and Science, Composed by the merger of Gansu Institute of Education and Gansu Union University in 2013.
College of Technology, Lanzhou
Lanzhou City College, founded 1958
Lanzhou University of Finance and Economics, The only financial and economic university in the three provinces of Gansu, Ningxia and Qinghai.
Lanzhou Jiaotong University, founded 1958
Lanzhou Medical College (Lanzhou Medical Institute) incorporated into Lanzhou University
Lanzhou Niuroumian (Noodle with beef soup) Cultural Research Institute
Lanzhou University of Technology,, founded 1919 (formerly Gansu University of Technology)
Northwest University for Nationalities
Northwest Normal University, founded 1902

Healthcare
 People's Hospital of Gansu
 Second People's Hospital of Gansu (see Borden Memorial Hospital, predecessor)
 Third People's Hospital of Gansu
 First People's Hospital of Lanzhou
 Second People's Hospital of Lanzhou
 Lanzhou University First Hospital
 Lanzhou University Second Hospital
 General Military Hospital
 Lanzhou Military Hospital
 Lanzhou Heavy Ion Cancer Treatment Center, joint venture by Sheng De Group, the city government and Chinese Academy of Sciences' Institution of Modern Physics
 Gansu Tumor Hospital

Sister cities
 Albuquerque, 
 Akita,  (friendship city)
 Ashkhabad, 
 Chorley, 
 Penza, 
 Nouakchott, 
 Young Shire,

See also
 List of twin towns and sister cities in China
 Dunhuang
 Lanzhousaurus

References

Bibliography

 Cheung, Raymond. OSPREY AIRCRAFT OF THE ACES 126: Aces of the Republic of China Air Force. Oxford: Bloomsbury Publishing Plc, 2015. .
 徐 (Xú), 露梅 (Lùméi). 隕落 (Fallen): 682位空军英烈的生死档案 - 抗战空军英烈档案大解密 (A Decryption of 682 Air Force Heroes of The War of Resistance-WWII and Their Martyrdom). 东城区, 北京， 中国: 团结出版社, 2016. .

External links

Lanzhou government website
Map of Lanzhou 

 
Populated places along the Silk Road
Cities in Gansu
Prefecture-level divisions of Gansu
Provincial capitals in China